Heidi Lewis may refer to:

Heidi Lewis, character played by Kim Matula
Heidi Lewis, contestant on The Voice UK (series 8)